Michelle Francini Montero Venegas (born 29 August 1994) is a Costa Rican footballer who plays as a forward for A.D. Municipal Pérez Zeledón and the Costa Rica national team.

Early life
Montero was born in Sarapiquí in Heredia Province.

Club career

UCEM Alajuela
While still in high school, Montero signed for UCEM Alajuela. On 5 May 2013, she scored five goals in a 6–1 victory against Carrillo.

AD Moravia
Montero initially retired in 2017, but signed with AD Moravia in 2019 following an invitation from coach Bernal Castillo.

C.S. Herediano
In January 2020, Montero joined C.S. Herediano when C.S. Herediano took over running of AD Moravia's senior team.

Liga Deportiva Juvenil de Macas
In February 2020, Montero and her Herediano teammate María José Morales joined Superliga Femenina side Liga Deportiva Juvenil de Macas on a seven-month loan. Both loans were terminated in July.

Hapoel Be'er Sheva F.C.
In February 2021, Montero signed with Ligat Nashim side Hapoel Be'er Sheva. Her three-month stint coincided with the 2021 Israel–Palestine crisis, which she later said impacted her mental health.

Cruz Azul
In July 2021, Montero signed with Liga MX Femenil side Cruz Azul, becoming the team's first foreign player.

A.D. Municipal Pérez Zeledón
In May 2022, Montero signed with Costa Rican Women's Premier Division team A.D. Municipal Pérez Zeledón.

International career
Montero represented Costa Rica in the 2014 CONCACAF Women's U-20 Championship, scoring in the third-place playoff against Trinidad and Tobago. She was later included in Costa Rica's squad for the 2014 FIFA U-20 Women's World Cup, scoring in a 5–1 loss to France.

Montero made her senior debut for Costa Rica on 30 November 2021, scoring in a 5–2 friendly win against Nicaragua.

References

External links
 
 
 

1994 births
Living people
People from Heredia Province
Costa Rican women's footballers
Women's association football forwards
Hapoel Be'er Sheva F.C. (women) players
Cruz Azul (women) footballers
Ligat Nashim players
Liga MX Femenil players
Costa Rican expatriate footballers
Costa Rican expatriates in Israel
Expatriate women's footballers in Israel
Costa Rican expatriate sportspeople in Mexico
Expatriate women's footballers in Mexico
Costa Rica women's international footballers